Sylvia Nomandla Bloem is a South African politician who is the current Northern Cape MEC for Transport and Safety Liaison. She was appointed to the post in June 2020. She has been a member of the Northern Cape Provincial Legislature since May 2019. From May 2019 to June 2020, she served as the Northern Cape MEC for Land Reform, Agriculture and Nature Conservation and Environmental Affairs. Bloem is a member of the African National Congress.

Provincial government
Bloem was not elected to the Northern Cape Provincial Legislature in the 2019 election, as she was placed 19th on the ANC's list and the party won only 18 seats. However, speaker Kenny Mmoiemang opted against serving in the legislature to go to parliament and the ANC chose Bloem to fill his seat. She was sworn in along with the other newly elected members on 22 May 2019.

On 28 May, premier Zamani Saul appointed Bloem Member of the Executive Council for the newly created Land Reform, Agriculture and Nature Conservation and Environmental Affairs portfolio. She was sworn in on the same day.

Bloem served in the position until her appointment as the MEC for Transport and Safety Liaison in June 2020. She succeeded Nontobeko Vilakazi, while Mase Manopole succeeded her as the MEC for Land Reform, Agriculture and Nature Conservation and Environmental Affairs.

References

External links
Ms Sylvia Nomandla Bloem – Northern Cape Provincial Legislature
Nomandla Bloem, Ms – South African Government

|-

Living people
African National Congress politicians
Members of the Northern Cape Provincial Legislature
People from the Northern Cape
South African women in politics
Year of birth missing (living people)